Stephen Allison (born March 29, 1971) is the former representative for the 8th District of the Georgia House of Representatives.  He is a graduate of the Virginia Military Institute and a practicing attorney in Blairsville, Georgia.  Stephen Allison was elected in November 2008 after a narrow victory over Democratic incumbent Charles F. Jenkins.

Family
Stephen is married to his wife Regina and together they live in Blairsville, Georgia and have two children: Thomas Jackson, Nathanael Greene.

Religion
Stephen is a Christian.

Education
Stephen received his BA in history from Virginia Military Institute in 1993 and obtained his JD from John Marshall Law School in 1996.

Professional experience
From 2000 to 2008 he was an attorney at The Allison Firm.

Organizations
In 1997 he was president of the Enotah Bar Association
He is a volunteer history teacher at Grace Co-Op

See also

Georgia General Assembly

References

Republican Party members of the Georgia House of Representatives
1971 births
Living people
People from Blairsville, Georgia
21st-century American politicians